Pantić is a Serbian surname. It may refer to:

Aleksandar Pantić (footballer born 1978) (born 1978), Serbian footballer
Aleksandar Pantić (footballer born 1992) (born 1992), Serbian footballer for Red Star Belgrade
Danilo Pantić (born 1996), Serbian footballer
Dano Pantić (born 1972), Serbian judoka
Đorđe Pantić (born 1980), Serbian footballer
Maja Pantić, Serbian computer scientist
Milinko Pantić (born 1966), Serbian footballer
Mladen Pantić (born 1982), Serbian basketball player
Snežana Pantić (born 1978), Serbian karate competitor
Zorica Pantic (born c. 1951), Yugoslav college administrator and professor of electrical engineering

Serbian surnames
Slavic-language surnames
Patronymic surnames
Surnames from given names